The Yorkshire Planetarium was a planetarium in the grounds of Harewood House, near Leeds, West Yorkshire, England, from May 2007 until October 2009. The Yorkshire Planetarium organisation announced that it is laying plans for a permanent base in Bradford and until that was developed it would tour various locations during the International Year of Astronomy 2009.

The planetarium was privately funded until it was sold to Bradford College, funded by the Regional Development Fund in April 2008.

The planetarium
The main attraction was the  diameter planetarium dome. There were guided tours of the sky by a live astronomer in the dark dome. Stars and planets were projected onto a negative pressure screen inside the dome by a Carl Zeiss ZKP4 star projector. This enabled visitors to gaze at the stars in a projection of the sky without the hindrance of light pollution and cloud cover while they lay on comfortable mats or deck chairs.

External links
The Yorkshire Planetarium official site

Planetaria in the United Kingdom
Defunct planetaria
Traveling exhibits